The 1912 Ice Hockey European Championship was the third edition of the ice hockey tournament for European countries associated to the International Ice Hockey Federation.

The tournament was held from February 2–4, 1912, in Prague, Bohemia. With Bohemia and Germany finishing equal on points, Bohemia was declared champion based on goals scored (not taking into account goals against). Following a protest by Germany, the tournament was annulled on March 22, 1912, as Austria did not become a member of the IIHF until after the tournament.

Results
February 2

February 3

February 4

Final standings

Top Goalscorer
Jaroslav Jarkovsky (Bohemia), 3 goals, Lange (Germany), 3 goals

References

 Euro Championship 1912

 
Ice Hockey European Championships
1912
1912
Ice Hockey European Championship
Ice Hockey European Championship
1910s in Prague
Sports competitions in Prague